Daniele Russo (born 3 November 1985) is a Swiss defender, who currently plays for AC Bellinzona.

References

External links

Living people
1985 births
Swiss men's footballers
Italian footballers
Swiss Super League players
Swiss Challenge League players
FC Lugano players
FC Chiasso players
AC Bellinzona players
FC St. Gallen players
FC Winterthur players
Place of birth missing (living people)
Association football defenders